Bela Torma (born 9 April 1930) is a Serbian wrestler. He competed in the men's Greco-Roman bantamweight at the 1952 Summer Olympics.

References

External links
 

1930 births
Possibly living people
Serbian male sport wrestlers
Olympic wrestlers of Yugoslavia
Wrestlers at the 1952 Summer Olympics
Place of birth missing (living people)